VNS3 is a software-only virtual appliance that allows users to control access and network topology and secure data in motion across public and private clouds. VNS3 is a virtual router, switch, firewall, protocol re-distributor, and SSL/IPSec VPN concentrator. The Network Virtualization Software creates a customer controlled overlay network over top of the underlying network backbone.

Uses 

VNS3 is a network routing and security virtual appliance that lets extend networks into public, private, and hybrid clouds  VNS3 lets enterprise data center administrators "create encrypted LAN between virtual machines in a private cloud, as well as encrypted WAN across multiple public clouds."

History 

Developers Cohesive Networks first named their multi-sourced infrastructure concept "v-cube-v." The software ran in internal production starting in 2007. The company named the early commercial version of VNS3 "VPN3" or "VPN-Cubed" and later renamed the software to VNS3 in 2012.

Amazon Web Services users first began downloading VPN-Cubed from the partner directory on 5 December 2008.  VNS3 gained popularity (as VPN-Cubed) as part of the Amazon Web Services public cloud ecosystem and with independent reviews from ZDNet, High Scalability, InfoQ, Chris Hoff, and CloudAve.

In 2012, developers Cohesive Networks released a major version update. The release updated the software to 3.0 and rebranded it as VNS3 (VNS-Cubed). 451 Research analyst William Fellows wrote "VNS[3] is not only for VPNs – hence the name change – since overlays can be within a cloud, between clouds, between a private datacenter and a cloud (or clouds), or between multiple datacenters."

In 2013, Cohesive Networks released a 3.0.1 version of the product, as well as a free edition of VNS3 in Amazon Web Services. VNS3 was recognized in the 6th Annual International Datacenters Awards as the winner of the Public Cloud Services & Infrastructure award  In early 2014 VNS3 3.5 was released with major software updates and a new integration with Docker Docker's open-source virtualization platform added the ability to run other networking applications as containers inside VNS3 virtual machines. Users can create an overlay network "as a substrate for layer 4-7 network application services – things like proxy, reverse proxy, SSL termination, content caching and network intrusion detection" William Fellows writes.

In early 2015 the company renamed to Cohesive Networks to emphasize the networking capabilities of VNS3  and to spin off the less successful part of the business. The company later announced a new line of VNS3-based products, including VNS3:turret application segmentation controller, the VNS3:ms network management platform, and the VNS3:ha - high availability add on.

After 2008, VNS3 became available in more public cloud providers and geographic regions, including Amazon Web Services EC2, GoGrid, Flexiant, IBM SoftLayer, Google Compute Engine, HP Cloud Services, Mircorsoft Azure, and CenturyLink Cloud.

Software 

VNS3 software creates IPSec tunneling connections similar to a site to site VPN. The connections can ensure a single LAN connection between virtual or cloud environments VNS3 gives secure access to cloud assets, extends the Virtual LAN segmentation, isolation, and security of a cloud provider's network.

The first VNS3 was built on a customized Ubuntu-based Linux using open source networking applications Openswan and OpenVPN. The development team chose OpenVPN "primarily because it uses standard OpenSSL encryption, runs on multiple operating systems and does not require kernel patching or additional modules."
VNS3 Managers are virtual machines that act as a VPN gateway for the other virtual machines in the same cloud infrastructure. VNS3 synchronizes between cloud managers using RabbitMQ. VNS3 enables users to turn multicast on and off in order to work on public clouds, allowing software configurations dependent on multicast to function in the cloud.

VNS3 software creates IPSec tunneling connections similar to a site-to-site VPN. The connections can ensure a single LAN network between multiple cloud environments. VNS3 secures connections to cloud deployments, extends the Virtual LAN segmentation, and ensures network isolation and security in a cloud provider's virtual environment. VNS3 has a web-based UI and traditional Linux system command line interface. The VNS3 API uses a Ruby script and Ruby language binding.

The developers earned a patent on the underlying cloud VPN technologies in 2010.

Availability 

VPN-Cubed has been available in Amazon Web Services cloud since December 5, 2008.According to the Cohesive Networks website, VNS3 is delivered as a virtual machine and is available in public clouds including: Amazon Web Services, Microsoft Azure, Google Compute Engine, ElasticHosts, IBM SoftLayer, and CenturyLink Cloud. Private clouds availability includes: Abiquo, Eucalyptus, Openstack; and virtual infrastructures such as: Xen, VMware, KVM, Citrix.

Pricing 

Since October 2008, VNS3 has been available for free on Amazon Web Services Microsoft Azure, and CenturyLink Cloud. Additional paid editions are listed on the Cohesive Networks website.

Release History

References

External links 

 

Routing software
Gateway/routing/firewall distribution
Routers (computing)
Virtual private networks